Malmstrom or Malmström is a Swedish, Danish and Finnish surname that comes from the word Malm, which means ore, and Strom, a word for current/stream. It may refer to:

People
August Malmström (1829–1901), Swedish academic painter
Cecilia Malmström (born 1968), Swedish politician, minister for European Affairs
Einar Axel Malmstrom (1907–1954), American Air Force pilot, eponym of Malmstrom Air Force Base
Gustaf Malmström (1884-1970), Swedish wrestler
Håkan Malmström (born 1977), defender in the Swedish football club
Henrik Malmström (born 1984), Swedish ice hockey player
Karl Malmström (1875–1938), Swedish diver
Louise Malmström (born 1972), Swedish social democratic politician

Other
 Malmstrom Air Force Base, Montana, USA

Swedish-language surnames